The Santa Clara Formation is a geologic formation in the southeastern Santa Cruz Mountains, in Santa Clara County, California.

Geology 
It was formed during the late Pliocene and early Pleistocene Ages of the Neogene Period resp. the Quaternary Period, during the Cenozoic Era.  It is composed of fluvial boulder to pebble gravel, sandstone, and siltstone locally including thin bedded lacustrine mudstone.

It preserves fossils dating back to the Neogene period.

See also 

 List of fossiliferous stratigraphic units in California
 
 Paleontology in California

References

Further reading 
 USGS.gov: "Geologic maps and structure sections of the southwestern Santa Clara Valley and southern Santa Cruz Mountains, Santa Clara and Santa Cruz Counties, California"
  AAPG Datapages/Archives: "The Santa Clara Formation as a Record of Late Cenozoic Uplift of the Santa Cruz Mountains, Santa Clara County, California"
 

Geologic formations of California
Neogene California
Pliocene California
Pleistocene California
Sandstone formations of the United States
Siltstone formations
Fluvial deposits
Lacustrine deposits
Paleontology in California
Geology of Santa Clara County, California
Santa Cruz Mountains